Gas Point is a ghost town in Shasta County, California, on Cottonwood Creek. It was also known as Pinckney and Janesville. The ghost town burned to the ground on April 8, 2008.

References

Ghost towns in California
Geography of Shasta County, California